Readalong was an educational Canadian television program for young children, first produced in 1975 for TVOntario.  A total of 90 episodes were produced, each about 10 minutes in length.  The first set of 30 shows were produced in 1975 and 1976, and focused on simple word recognition.  The next 30 were produced in 1977, and began to incorporate more sophisticated reading skills.  The final 30 episodes were produced in 1979, and had segments that focused on reading full sentences.  The show was seen throughout Canada on various provincial educational networks, and throughout the United States on various PBS affiliates.  Episodes continued to air in some markets through the 1980s and into the early 1990s.

The program taught fundamentals of reading with the help of live child actors, puppets, and animated interstitial segments.  The show was hosted by a cheerful talking boot named Boot, voiced by Jack Duffy. Another puppet character included from the very beginning was a comically dressed grandmother figure named Granny, voiced by Max Ferguson.  Other puppets were gradually added to the mix, most notably a pink, female shoe named Miss Pretty, voiced by Julie Amato.  Later puppet characters that appeared over the years included Mister Bones (a skeleton), the Explorer, House, and the Thing.  All were voiced by Ferguson and Duffy.  Amato also voiced a female auto racing boot named Dynamite Dinah.

The program was a marketing hit for TVOntario and had strong international sales lasting many years.

The Granny, Boot, and Pretty puppets are now housed at the Canadian Museum of History. Noreen Young, who designed the puppets, also created puppets for other programs, including Under the Umbrella Tree. The characters were developed by Ken Sobol, who also wrote all the scripts for the series. The show's music was composed by Eric Robertson.

Credits
 Children: Reena Schellenberg, Moira Knott, Bobby Prochaska, Eric Braslis, Adrian Rajaram
 Puppeteers: Noreen Young, Bob Dermer, Nina Keogh
 Voices: Max Ferguson, Jack Duffy, Julie Amato
 Music: Eric Robertson
 Animation: Bill Reed, Patricia Crudden, John Leach, Bill Borg
 Editors: Brian Elston, Paul Spencer, Doug Beavan, Bob Baker
 Writer: Ken Sobol
 Educational Supervisors: Ruth Vernon, Jennifer Harvey
 Production Assistant: Jeannie Mougeot, Janice Newland, Frances Revell
 Producer/Director: Peter McLean, Chris Homer, Jeremy Pollock

External links
 

1970s Canadian children's television series
TVO original programming
Television shows filmed in Toronto
1976 Canadian television series debuts
Reading and literacy television series
Canadian television shows featuring puppetry
Canadian children's education television series
Canadian television series with live action and animation
English-language television shows